The Yamaha RA75 is a racing motorcycle produced by Yamaha, for the 125cc class of Grand Prix motorcycle racing, in 1963.

RA 75
After Yamaha did not appear in the 125cc world championship competitions in 1962, the RA75 was presented in 1963 which, compared to the previous one, had a slight increase in stroke and an increase in power to 25 HP delivered at a higher rpm. high, at 12,000 rpm; the gearbox was also brought to 8 reports. It was the last series equipped with a single-cylinder engine.

References

RA75
Grand Prix motorcycles